Cossulus alatauicus is a moth in the family Cossidae. It is found in Kazakhstan.

The length of the forewings is 14–16 mm. The forewings are yellow, with a submarginal area without a pattern. There are isolated brownish strokes and spots in the central and basal areas of the wing. The hindwings are light yellow at the base and light grey on the periphery.

References

Natural History Museum Lepidoptera generic names catalog

Moths described in 2006
Cossinae
Moths of Asia